The Damnation Game is the second studio album by progressive metal band Symphony X, released in 1995 through Zero Corporation (Japan) and Inside Out Music (Europe); a remastered edition was reissued on September 13, 2004 through Inside Out. The album is the band's first to feature current singer Russell Allen, who replaced Rod Tyler after the release of their 1994 self-titled debut album.

Musical references
The middle section of "Dressed to Kill", after the guitar solo, cites Johann Sebastian Bach's "Prelude in C minor (BWV 847)" from The Well-Tempered Clavier (Book 1, 1722).

The intro of "The Damnation Game" cites Carl Philipp Emanuel Bach's Solfeggietto in C minor (H 220, Wq. 117: 2) (1766).

Critical reception

Robert Taylor at AllMusic gave The Damnation Game two stars out of five, calling it an improvement over the band's debut album while criticizing the many influences taken from guitarist Yngwie Malmsteen's work: "Guitarist Michael Romeo's licks and solos are lifted right off of Malmsteen's Rising Force and Marching Out". Allen's vocals were also likened to that of Mark Boals and Jeff Scott Soto, also from Malmsteen's earlier bands.

Track listing

Personnel
Russell Allen – lead vocals, background vocals
Michael Romeo – guitar, background vocals
Michael Pinnella – keyboard, background vocals
Jason Rullo – drums, background vocals
Thomas Miller – bass, background vocals
Technical personnel
Michael Romeo – production
Suha Gur – mastering
Steve Evetts – production
Eric Rachel – production

References

External links
The Damnation Game at symphonyx.com
Symphony X "The Damnation Game" at Guitar Nine Records

Symphony X albums
1995 albums
Inside Out Music albums
Albums produced by Steve Evetts